The open-mid back unrounded vowel or low-mid back unrounded vowel, is a type of vowel sound, used in some spoken languages. Both the symbol and the sound are commonly referred to as a "wedge", "caret" or "hat". In transcriptions for English, this symbol is commonly used for the near-open central unrounded vowel and in transcriptions for Danish, it is used for the (somewhat mid-centralized) open back rounded vowel.

Features

Occurrence

Daniel Jones reported his speech (southern British) as having an advanced back vowel  between his central  and back ; however, he also reported that other southern speakers had a lower and even more advanced vowel that approached cardinal . In American English varieties, such as in the West, the Midwest, and the urban South, the typical phonetic realization of the phoneme  is an open-mid central . Truly backed variants of  that are phonetically  can occur in Inland Northern American English, Newfoundland English, Philadelphia English, some of African-American English, and (old-fashioned) white Southern American English in coastal plain and Piedmont areas. That may be because of both tradition and some other dialects retaining the older pronunciation.

Notes

References

External links
 

Open-mid vowels
Back vowels
Unrounded vowels